This is a list of currently serving members House of Commons, House of Lords, Scottish Parliament, National Assembly for Wales, Northern Ireland Assembly, Police and Crime Commissioner who are military veterans.

House of Commons

House of Lords

Police and Crime Commissioner

London Assembly

Scottish Parliament

See also
 British Army
 Royal Air Force
 Royal Navy
 Royal Marines
 Defence Select Committee

References

House Of Commons Of The United Kingdom
House Of Commons Of The United Kingdom
Military veterans
Military veterans
House Of Commons Of The United Kingdom
British
Military veterans
House Of Commons Of The United Kingdom